Women's Voices Now (WVN) is an American non-profit organization that "uses film to drive positive social change that advances girls' and women's rights globally". It organizes online short film festivals and other activities in its mission to "amplif[y] the voices of all women by promoting the free expression of women's struggles for civil, economic, political, and gender rights worldwide". In addition to its festivals, WVN expanded to include an archive of films, a publication, educational programs, screenings, workshops and training, as well as providing scholarships. The organization was founded in 2010 by lawyer Catinca Tabacaru and philanthropist Leslie Sacks.

Festival history 
The organization was founded in 2010, and its first film festival was held in 2011. Every festival has a theme; the first festival's theme was Women's Voices from the Muslim World: A Short Film Festival. The festival had over 200 films submitted from over 40 countries showcasing what life is like for women in the Muslim world. The 2014 festival's theme was Women Bought and Sold: Voices United Against Violence. The third, fourth and fifth festivals were held in 2016, 2017 and 2018 respectively, with both the fifth and sixth occurring in 2019. Each film festival had winners for six main categories. The categories are the Leslie Sacks Grand Prize for best overall film; Best Documentary Feature; Best Documentary Short; Best Narrative Short; Best Experimental Film; and Audience Choice for the last four categories. The prizes for some of the categories include: $3,000 for the Leslie Sacks Grand Prize, $2,000 dollars for the winner in the Best Documentary Feature category, and $1,000 dollars each for the winners in the Best Documentary Short and Best Experimental Film categories. The winners receive their prize once they deliver their acceptance speech to Women's Voice Now.

The festival participants agree to participate in the online festival, and submit the final cut without any advertisements (with subtitles if required, since the Festival's official language is English). The upload and submission must include a high-resolution digital copy of the film, along with three stills, a poster, and a trailer if the film has one. If the participant wins, they must allow their film to be screened at the festival's closing event, and allow it to be available on the website. The films must be about women (including trans women) and the issues they face in society today. To be eligible, the filmmakers must guarantee the film is entirely their content, and those in the film must all have consented to be filmed. The films vary in length as there is no time constraint.

Other programming 
In addition to the yearly film festival, Women's Voice Now also hosts an online archive of the festivals' films, as well as an online publication called The WVoice. Like the film festival, The WVoice focuses on international women's rights and voices. It publishes written, audio, and visual bodies of work that document women's stories and issues that educate and foster cultural difference and connections, and promotes and advocates for women's rights. The generally brief entries include essays, interviews, prose, short fiction, poetry, photo essays, and video essays under five minutes in length. Women's Voice Now also runs workshops and training programs on what they do with their film festivals and how they support women's rights advocacy.

Women's Voices Now also runs a youth development program, Girls' Voices Now.

2011 film festival winners

2014 film festival winners

2017 film festival winners

2018 film festival winners

References

External links

Women's rights organizations
Non-profit organizations based in Los Angeles